Team Giant–Castelli was a professional men's cycling team based in Denmark, which competed in elite road bicycle racing events under UCI Continental rules.

The team disbanded at the end of the 2017 season.

Team roster
As at 31 December 2017

Major wins
2017
Stage 2 Paris-Arras Tour, Frederik Rodenberg
Stage 2 Flèche du Sud, Casper Pedersen
Stage 3 Ronde de l'Oise, Rasmus Quaade
GP Horsens Posten, Casper Pedersen
 U23 Road Race Championships, Casper Pedersen

National & continental Champions
2017
 European U23 Road Race, Casper Pedersen
 Denmark Track (Team pursuit), Mikkel Bjerg
 Denmark Track (Team pursuit), Casper Pedersen
 Denmark Track (Team pursuit), Rasmus Quaade
 Denmark Track (Team pursuit), Casper Von Folsach
 Denmark Track (Points race), Casper Von Folsach

References

Cycling teams based in Denmark